Jonathan Grant Evans (born 3 January 1988) is a Northern Irish professional footballer who plays as a defender for  club Leicester City and the Northern Ireland national team.

Evans started his career at Manchester United and progressed through the club's academy. He went on loan to Royal Antwerp and Sunderland to gain first-team experience before making his Manchester United first-team debut in the 2007–08 League Cup. He became a regular first-team squad member the following season, and played almost 200 matches for Manchester United in an eight-year spell; however, he fell out of favour at the club under manager Louis van Gaal and left for West Bromwich Albion. After West Brom's relegation three years later, Evans signed for Leicester City. 

Evans is the second-most decorated player in Northern Irish football history. He has played 100 matches for the Northern Ireland national team, and was ever-present in the team's run to the round of 16 at UEFA Euro 2016.

Club career

Manchester United
Evans was scouted while playing for Greenisland F.C., the same club that his younger brother Corry and Craig Cathcart played for before moving to Manchester United. At the age of nine, he was invited to attend the Manchester United Centre of Excellence in Belfast, before being invited for a trial in Manchester a year later. Rule changes within The Football Association at the time meant that clubs were limited to players who lived within 90 minutes' travel of the club, so Evans' opportunities were limited. However, his family soon relocated to Manchester, allowing Evans to train with Manchester United full-time. He progressed through Manchester United's academy, featuring in two of the club's three games during the 2006 summer tour of South Africa, as well as domestic friendlies against Celtic and Preston North End. Evans also made a surprise appearance in the Amsterdam Tournament against Ajax.

Early loans

Royal Antwerp
Alongside fellow youngsters Darron Gibson, Danny Simpson and Fraizer Campbell, Evans spent the first half of the 2006–07 season on loan at Manchester United's Belgian feeder club Royal Antwerp.

Sunderland
In December 2006, he agreed to join Sunderland on loan in the January transfer window until the end of the 2006–07 season, again along with Danny Simpson. The pair helped Sunderland clinch the Championship title, with Evans winning the club's Youth Player of the Year award at the end of the season. Sunderland manager Roy Keane was hopeful of re-signing the young centre-back on another loan following their promotion to the Premier League, though United elected to keep him at the club to push for a place in the first team.

Evans ultimately rejoined Sunderland for a second loan spell on 4 January 2008, and was immediately drafted into the first team squad in a 3–0 loss to Wigan Athletic in the FA Cup. He played the full 90 minutes but was criticised for Wigan's second goal of the game, prior to which he lost the ball on the edge of his own box, resulting in a deflected own goal by Paul McShane. Making 15 league appearances, Evans helped Sunderland avoid relegation back to the Championship.

Return to Manchester United

2007–2011

Evans made his Manchester United debut on 26 September 2007 against Coventry City in the League Cup which ended in a 2–0 defeat. He then appeared as a late substitute for Gerard Piqué in a UEFA Champions League match at home to Dynamo Kyiv on 7 November 2007 to secure Manchester United's qualification to the knockout stage of the competition. He subsequently made his first Champions League start on 12 December 2007 against Roma.

Evans made his league debut for United in a 1–1 draw with Chelsea on 21 September 2008, filling in for the suspended Nemanja Vidić. In December 2008, Evans made two substitute appearances at the FIFA Club World Cup, including one in the final after Vidić was sent off shortly after half-time. Evans continued to deputise throughout the rest of the season, appearing in a number of league games and in the League Cup final.

At the beginning of the 2010–11 football season, Evans became a regular fixture in the United team, partnering Vidić in the centre of defence in the absence of the injured Rio Ferdinand. On 19 March 2011, Evans injured Bolton Wanderers midfielder Stuart Holden with a tackle which ruled Holden out initially for six months, though eventually caused the United States international to be sidelined for 22 months. Despite Evans receiving a straight red card for the tackle, Manchester United went on to win the game 1–0 with a Dimitar Berbatov goal.

2011–2015
Before the start of the 2011–12 season, Evans was handed the number 6 shirt after Wes Brown was transferred to Sunderland. On 14 August, he wore his new shirt number for the first time in United's opening day 2–1 win at West Bromwich Albion, coming on for the injured Vidić in the 52nd minute at The Hawthorns. On 23 October, he was sent off in United's 6–1 defeat against Manchester City after bringing down Mario Balotelli in a last-man challenge. Evans made his 100th appearance for the Red Devils on 30 November, playing the full 120 minutes as United lost 2–1 to Championship side Crystal Palace in the League Cup quarter-final. On 18 March 2012, he scored his first goal for United, opening the scoring in a 5–0 league win away to Wolverhampton Wanderers. Evans missed the final three games of the season with a foot injury.

Having undergone surgery to repair an ankle injury at the end of the previous season, Evans was unable to commence his preseason training until early August. Evans scored his second goal for the club in a 3–0 win away at Newcastle United on 7 October 2012, thumping home a header from a Robin van Persie corner. On 23 October, he scored his first UEFA Champions League goal and his first at Old Trafford, scrambling home from a corner kick the 2-2 equaliser in a 3–2 victory over Braga. Evans netted his third goal of the season on 24 November 2012, heading in the equaliser from a corner to begin a 3–1 comeback victory against Queens Park Rangers at Old Trafford. On 21 December 2012, Evans signed a new contract with United which would keep him at the club until June 2016. He scored his third league goal of the season and fourth overall on Boxing Day in a 4–3 win against Newcastle, tapping home after Javier Hernández's shot had been saved by Tim Krul. He scored an own goal moments later, turning into his own net a cross from former United, Antwerp and Sunderland teammate Danny Simpson.

On 4 March 2015, Newcastle striker Papiss Cissé spat at Evans after Evans spat in Cissé's direction following an altercation. Neither player was punished by the referee during the game, though both were charged by the FA after review. Evans denied the charge and said "I would like to make it clear that I did not spit at Papiss Cissé. Having woken up this morning, I am shocked to have seen the media coverage from last night's match." He was banned for six games on 7 March, with Cissé banned for seven due to a previous suspension.

West Bromwich Albion

Evans signed for Premier League club West Bromwich Albion for an undisclosed fee on 29 August 2015. He made his debut for the club on 12 September 2015 in a 0–0 draw against Southampton. On 2 January 2016, Evans scored his first West Brom goal in a 2–1 victory over Stoke City. On 15 May 2016, before the final game of the season, he received the Players' Player of the Season award for his first season at the club.

He had to wait a long time for his next goal, which came in a 3–1 win over Watford on 3 December 2016. His next goal came in a 2–1 loss against Swansea on the final game of the season.

In July 2017, following the departure of club skipper Darren Fletcher to Stoke City, Evans was confirmed permanent captain by head coach Tony Pulis. He scored his first goal of the season on 30 September 2017 in a 2–2 draw against Watford, scoring a header as he had done ten months earlier against the same opponent. His second goal of the season was against Brighton at home on 13 January 2018, which brought his side's first league win in five months and 20 games.

Leicester City
In June 2018, Leicester City triggered the £3.5 million relegation release clause in Evans' West Brom contract. He signed a three-year contract with the Foxes, and made his Leicester debut in a 2–0 victory over Wolverhampton Wanderers on 18 August 2018. He scored his first goal for the club in a 4–1 defeat to Crystal Palace on 23 February 2019.

Evans made his 400th appearance in English football on 12 July 2020 and scored an own goal in a 1–4 defeat away to AFC Bournemouth in the Premier League.

Ahead of the 2022–23 season, Evans was appointed captain following the departure of previous captain Kasper Schmeichel.

International career
Despite having not yet made his senior debut for Manchester United, Evans was called up to the full Northern Ireland squad for the first time in September 2006, making his debut in the memorable 3–2 victory over Spain. On 28 March 2009, Evans scored his first international goal in a 3–2 win over Poland in 2010 FIFA World Cup qualification, volleying home from close range.

On 28 May 2016, Evans was included by national team manager Michael O'Neill in Northern Ireland's final 23-man squad for UEFA Euro 2016. This was the first time Northern Ireland had ever been involved in the finals of the competition, and their first major tournament since the 1986 FIFA World Cup. The team eventually reached the last 16, being knocked out by Wales after a 1–0 defeat. Evans participated in all four of Northern Ireland's games in the tournament.

His second international goal came eight and a half years after his first on 4 September 2017, via a header in a 2–0 victory against the Czech Republic in 2018 FIFA World Cup qualification. Northern Ireland reached a November playoff versus Switzerland, aiming to qualify for the World Cup for the first time in 32 years. They suffered a 1–0 defeat in the first leg with the winner coming from a controversial penalty awarded by Romanian referee Ovidiu Hategan. Corry Evans was penalised for handball, though the ball clearly struck the player's shoulder; manager Michael O'Neill said it was the worst decision he had ever seen in a game he had been involved in. A goalless draw in the second leg three days later meant Northern Ireland were eliminated from qualification. Evans nearly scored a winner in injury time of the second leg which would have levelled the aggregate score; his header beat Switzerland goalkeeper Yann Sommer but was cleared off the line by defender Ricardo Rodriguez, who had converted the penalty in the first leg.

Evans scored his third goal at senior international level when he opened the scoring against Belarus in Northern Ireland's second game of the qualification phase for UEFA Euro 2020. On 27 September 2022 in the Nations League game against Greece, he became the fourth player to make 100 appearances for Northern Ireland.

Personal life
Evans was born in Belfast. He was a student at Belfast High School in Newtownabbey before being enrolled at Ashton-on-Mersey School in Sale, Greater Manchester, once he had been signed by Manchester United. He holds nine GCSEs, all A* or A grades.

On 19 December 2007, Evans was arrested in connection with an alleged rape that occurred at the hotel where Manchester United's Christmas party was held. On 8 March 2008, it was reported that he would not be prosecuted for any offence.

On 1 June 2013, Evans married Helen McConnell, an MUTV reporter, at Clough Presbyterian Church. As of December 2019, the couple had three children.

Career statistics

Club

International

Scores and results list Northern Ireland's goal tally first

Honours
Sunderland
Football League Championship: 2006–07

Manchester United
Premier League: 2008–09, 2010–11, 2012–13 
UEFA Champions League: 2007–08 
Football League Cup: 2008–09, 2009–10
FA Community Shield: 2008, 2010, 2011, 2013
FIFA Club World Cup: 2008

Leicester City
FA Cup: 2020–21

References

External links

Profile at the Leicester City F.C. website
Profile at the Irish Football Association website

1988 births
Living people
Association footballers from Belfast
Association footballers from Northern Ireland
Association football defenders
Manchester United F.C. players
Royal Antwerp F.C. players
Sunderland A.F.C. players
West Bromwich Albion F.C. players
Leicester City F.C. players
Challenger Pro League players
English Football League players
Premier League players
FA Cup Final players
Northern Ireland youth international footballers
Northern Ireland under-21 international footballers
Northern Ireland international footballers
UEFA Euro 2016 players
Expatriate association footballers from Northern Ireland
Expatriate footballers in Belgium
Expatriate sportspeople from Northern Ireland in Belgium
People educated at Belfast High School
FIFA Century Club